Tantaré Ecological Reserve is an ecological reserve in Quebec, Canada. It was established on March 1, 1978.

References

External links
 Official website from Government of Québec

Protected areas of Capitale-Nationale
Nature reserves in Quebec
Protected areas established in 1978
1978 establishments in Quebec